Philip Miller FRS (1691 – 18 December 1771) was an English botanist and gardener of Scottish descent.  Miller was chief gardener at the Chelsea Physic Garden for nearly 50 years from 1722, and wrote the highly popular The Gardeners Dictionary.

Life
Born in Deptford or Greenwich, Miller was chief gardener at the Chelsea Physic Garden from 1722 until he was pressured to retire shortly before his death. According to the botanist Peter Collinson, who visited the physic garden in July 1764 and recorded his observation in his commonplace books, Miller "has raised the reputation of the Chelsea Garden so much that it excels all the gardens of Europe for its amazing variety of plants of all orders and classes and from all climates..." He wrote The Gardener's and Florists Dictionary or a Complete System of Horticulture (1724) and The Gardener's Dictionary containing the Methods of Cultivating and Improving the Kitchen Fruit and Flower Garden, which first appeared in 1731 in an impressive folio and passed through eight expanding editions in his lifetime and was translated into Dutch by Job Baster.

Botanical work
Miller corresponded with other botanists, and obtained plants from all over the world, many of which he cultivated for the first time in England and is credited as their introducer. His knowledge of living plants, for which he was elected a Fellow of the Royal Society, was unsurpassed in breadth in his lifetime. He trained William Aiton, who later became head gardener at Kew, and William Forsyth, after whom Forsythia was named. The Duke of Bedford contracted him to supervise the pruning of fruit trees at Woburn Abbey and the care of his prized collection of American trees, especially evergreens, which were grown from seeds that, on Miller's suggestion, had been sent in barrels from Pennsylvania, where they had been collected by John Bartram. Through a consortium of sixty subscribers, 1733–66, the contents of Bartram's boxes introduced such American trees as Abies balsamea and Pinus rigida into English gardens.

Miller was reluctant to use the new binomial nomenclature of Carl Linnaeus, preferring the classifications of Joseph Pitton de Tournefort and John Ray at first. Linnaeus, nevertheless, applauded Miller's Gardeners Dictionary, The conservative Scot actually retained a number of pre-Linnaean binomial signifiers discarded by Linnaeus but which have been retained by modern botanists. He only fully changed to the Linnaean system in the edition of The Gardeners Dictionary of 1768, though he had already described some genera, such as Larix and Vanilla, validly under the Linnaean system earlier, in the fourth edition (1754).

Miller sent the first long-strand cotton seeds, which he had developed, to the new British American colony of Georgia in 1733. They were first planted on Sea Island, off the coast of Georgia, and hence derived the name of the finest cotton, Sea Island Cotton.

The presumed portrait, engraved by C.J. Maillet and affixed to the posthumous French edition of Miller's Gardeners Dictionary, 1787, shows the wrong Miller, John Frederick Miller, son of the London-based Nuremberg artist Johann Sebastian Müller. No authentic portrait is known.

Miller's two sons worked under him; one, Charles, became the first head of the Cambridge Botanic Garden.



Notes

References

Bibliography

 Philip Miller and the Gardeners Dictionary. University of Toronto

External links
 Miller, Philip (1760) The Gardeners Kalendar – digital facsimile from Linda Hall Library
 Miller, Philip (1760) Figures of the most beautiful, useful, and uncommon plants, 2 vols. – digital facsimile from Linda Hall Library
Elliott, Brent (2011) Philip Miller as a natural philosopher, in Eighteenth-century Science in the Garden - Occasional Papers from RHS Lindley Library, volume 5 March 2011.

Scottish botanists
English horticulturists
Botanists with author abbreviations
1691 births
1771 deaths
Fellows of the Royal Society
English people of Scottish descent
Place of birth missing
18th-century British botanists
English garden writers